Stránská skála is a hill and a national nature monument in Brno in the Czech Republic. It refers to a Mid-Pleistocene-Cromerian interglacial most important paleontological site in Central Europe.

Location
Stránská skála is situated in the northern part of the Brno-Slatina district, in the eastern part of Brno. From the geomorphological point of view, Stránská skála belongs to the Dyje–Svratka Valley within the Outer Subcarpathia.

Description
Stránská skála is dating to approximately 600,000 BP, as supported by paleomagnetic dating. Its northwestern slope is composed from karstified limestone cliffs in which numerous fossiliferous fissures and caves were found. Approximately 48 meter (157 ft) of this slope are covered by complex talus fan.

Paleontology
At this place extensive excavations were made by paleontologist Rudolf Musil and his colleagues in 1956–1968 which yielded rich paleothological material, including Homotherium moravicum teeth and approximately 1600 bones and bone fragments of birds from 23 families, 51 genera and 68 species. Earlier (1943) were Ursus deningeri discovered, an later rich spectrum of coastal animal fossils such as ostracods, bivalves and fishes. The other terrestrial fossil animals are represented mostly of snakes. The site is unique in that it has been a particularly abundant source of prehistoric artifacts (especially stone tools) dating from the Acheulean period, ower Bohunician to Neolitics and Eneolitics, which spanned roughly 27,000 to 20,000 B.C. In addition to the abundance of various stone tools were discovered also fireplaces (the older one 250.000 BP).

Gallery

See also
Homotherium
Ursus deningeri

References
 Valoch, Karel (1989). The Early Upper Palaeolithic in the Eastern Part of Central Europe, Anthropologie XXVII, 2–3, 89–91.
 Valoch, Karel (2000). More on the Question of Neanderthal Acculturation in Central Europe, in:Current Anthropology 41:4, 625–626. Chicago
 Mlíkovský, Jiří, (2002): Early Pleistocene birds of Stránská skála, Czech Republic: 2. Absolon's cave. Sylvia 38: s. 19–27

Further reading
 Musil, Rudolf (ed.1995): Stránská skála Hill. Excavation of open-air sediments 1964–1972. Antropos, Brno 1995,   (Antropos,  English).
 Musil, Rudolf (1968), Valoch Karel: Stránská skála: Its meaning for Pleistocene Studies.- Current Anthropology 9/5, part II, 534–539, Glasgow.
 Musil, Rudolf (1999): The environment in Moravia during the stage 3.- State of the Stage Project at the Start of its fourth Phase, News 7, 69–78, Cambridge.
 Musil, Rudolf (2003): The Early Upper Palaeolithic Fauna from Stránská skála. In: J.A. Svoboda and Ofer Bar –Yosef, Eds.: Stránská Skála. Origins of the Upper Palaeolithic in the Brno Basin, Moravia, Czech Republic.- American School of Prehistoric Research Bulletin 47, Dolní Věstonice Studies 10, 213–218, Peabody Museum of Archaeology and Ethnology, Harvard University

External links
 National Nature Monuments in CR: Stránská skála (English)
 Stránská skála Hill PDF 16 Seiten, English.
 City trafic connection – Tram time table line N°10  TO (on line, Czech)
 City trafic connection – Tram time table line N°10  OF (on line, Czech)

Archaeological sites in the Czech Republic
Pleistocene paleontological sites of Europe
Brno